Milo Melankthon Dimmick (October 30, 1811 – November 22, 1872) was a Democratic member of the U.S. House of Representatives from Pennsylvania.

Biography
Milo Melankthon Dimmick (brother of William Harrison Dimmick) was born in Milford, Pennsylvania.  He pursued classical studies, studied law, was admitted to the bar in 1834 and commenced practice in Stroudsburg, Pennsylvania.

Dimmick was elected as a Democrat to the Thirty-first and Thirty-second Congresses.  While a member of congress, he served a chairman of the United States House Committee on Expenditures in the Department of War during the Thirty-first and Thirty-second Congresses.  He was not a candidate for renomination in 1852.  He resumed the practice of law.  He was an unsuccessful candidate for president judge of the twenty-second judicial district of Pennsylvania in 1853.  He moved to Mauch Chunk, Pennsylvania, in 1853 where he continued the practice of law and also engaged in the banking business.  He died there in 1872, and was buried in Mauch Chunk Cemetery.

Sources

The Political Graveyard

1811 births
1872 deaths
People from Milford, Pennsylvania
Pennsylvania lawyers
Democratic Party members of the United States House of Representatives from Pennsylvania
19th-century American politicians
19th-century American lawyers